The 2015 Katowice Open was a women's tennis tournament played on indoor hard courts. It was the 3rd edition of the Katowice Open, in the International category of the 2015 WTA Tour. It took place at Spodek arena in Katowice, Poland, from 6 April through 12 April 2015.

Points and prize money

Point distribution

Prize money

Singles main-draw entrants

Seeds 

 1 Rankings as of 23 March 2015.

Other entrants 
The following players received wildcards into the main draw:
  Magdalena Fręch
  Urszula Radwańska

The following player used a protected ranking to gain entry into the singles main draw:
 Vera Zvonareva

The following players received entry from the qualifying draw:
  Magda Linette
  Shahar Pe'er
  Petra Martić
  Nigina Abduraimova

The following player received entry as a lucky loser:
  Elizaveta Kulichkova

Withdrawals 
Before the tournament
  Vitalia Diatchenko →replaced by María Teresa Torró Flor
  Océane Dodin (ear infection) →replaced by Elizaveta Kulichkova
  Julia Görges →replaced by Denisa Allertová
  Johanna Larsson →replaced by Anna-Lena Friedsam
  Karolína Plíšková →replaced by An-Sophie Mestach
  Francesca Schiavone →replaced by Misaki Doi

WTA doubles main-draw entrants

Seeds 

 1 Rankings as of 23 March 2015.

Other entrants 
The following pair received a wildcard into the main draw:
  Magdalena Fręch /  Katarzyna Kawa

Champions

Singles 

  Anna Karolína Schmiedlová def.  Camila Giorgi 6–4, 6–3

Doubles 

  Ysaline Bonaventure /  Demi Schuurs def.  Gioia Barbieri /  Karin Knapp, 7–5, 4–6, [10–6]

References

External links 
 

Katowice Open
Katowice Open
2015
April 2015 sports events in Europe